The Honda LPGA Thailand is a women's professional golf tournament in Thailand on the LPGA Tour. First played in 2006 at the Amata Spring Country Club, the tournament moved to the Siam Country Club, Pattaya in 2007, on its Old Course. It was the first LPGA Tour event held in Thailand and it increased the number of countries on the 2006 LPGA schedule to eight, including the United States.

The tournament was not held in 2008, but returned to the LPGA schedule in 2009. It was held at the newer Plantation Course for this year only, then returned to the Old Course in 2010. The tournament is a limited-field event with no cut; in 2011, 60 players were in the tournament (57 professionals and 3 amateurs); a full-field LPGA tournament has about 144 players. The 2012 event included a field of 70 players, with top-ranked Yani Tseng successfully defending her title, one stroke ahead of runner-up Ai Miyazato, the 2010 champion.

The title sponsor is Honda, a Japanese-based manufacturer of automobiles, trucks, motorcycles, scooters, and robots.

Tournament names
 2006–2009: Honda LPGA Thailand
 2010: Honda PTT LPGA Thailand
 2011–present: Honda LPGA Thailand

Tournament hosts

No event in 2008 and 2020

Winners

Tournament records

Video
YouTube - LPGA Rewind, highlights of 2010 event

References

External links

Coverage on the LPGA Tour's official site

LPGA Tour events
Golf tournaments in Thailand
Recurring sporting events established in 2006
2006 establishments in Thailand